Xiong Guangkai (born 15 March 1939) is a retired Chinese general.

Biography 
Xiong was born in Shanghai on 15 March 1939, while his ancestral home in Nanchang, Jiangxi. He joined the People's Liberation Army (PLA) in 1956 and the Chinese Communist Party (CCP) in 1959. Xiong was Deputy Director (1984–88) and later Director (1988–92) of the Intelligence Bureau of the PLA General Staff Department, Assistant (1992–96) and later Deputy Chief-of Staff (1996–2005). In 1988 he was conferred the rank of Major General, in 1994 Lieutenant General and in 2000 General.

Xiong also served on the Central Leading Group on Taiwan, He was an alternate member of the 14th, 15th and 16th Central Committees  and is currently an adjunct professor at Qinghua and Beijing Universities and Chairman of the Chinese Institute for International Securities Studies.

In 1995, General Xiong was widely but incorrectly quoted as threatening to use nuclear weapons against Los Angeles. The person to whom he was alleged to have said this, Chas Freeman, denies it.

On China-Pakistan Relations 
When confronted about Beijing's uncompromising support for Pakistan, Xiong Guangkai famously said, "Pakistan is China's Israel." Andrew Small, the author of The China-Pakistan Axis: Asia's New Geopolitics, characterizes this remark as "part explanation, part sarcastic jibe, delivered by (China's) military intelligence chief after one too many meetings with US counterparts on the subject."

References

External links
 
 China Vitae

1939 births
Living people
People's Liberation Army generals from Shanghai
Alternate members of the 14th Central Committee of the Chinese Communist Party
Alternate members of the 15th Central Committee of the Chinese Communist Party
Alternate members of the 16th Central Committee of the Chinese Communist Party